Swirsky (feminine: Swirskaya) is an East Slavic-language surname, a variant of the Polish surname Świrski. Another Russian-language form is Svirsky.

Notable people with this surname include:

 Chuck Swirsky (b. 1954) - sports commentator.
 David Swirsky - vocalist for the Moshav Band 
 Rachel Swirsky (b. 1982) - science fiction & fantasy author.
 Robert Swirsky (b. 1962) - computer scientist, author, pianist.
 Seth Swirsky (b. 1960) - songwriter, recording artist, author.
 Thamara Swirskaya (1888-1961), Russia-born dancer